Zygaena magiana  is a species of moth in the Zygaenidae family. It is found in Central Asia. 

Z.magiana (7b) is a pale-coloured, somewhat transparent, Burnet from the mountains near Samarkand, about the habits of which little definite is known. — The ab. hissariensis Gr.-Grsh [ now Zygaena magiana ssp. hissariensis Grum-Grshimailo, 1890] , which is connected with the preceding by all intergradations and which occurs in the same country, has the spots of the forewing small and sharply defined; the 6 transverse spot and the vestiges of the abdominal belt which appear occasionally are without weight in distinguishing this form ; from Virgil Gazi, end of July. — In the likewise Central Asiatic kohistana Gr.-Grsh.[ now Z. m. ssp. kohistana Grum-Grshimailo, 1893]] on the contrary there are only vestiges of a red collar and abdominal belt.

References

Moths described in 1889
Zygaena
Moths of Asia